Indian actress Tabu appears primarily in Hindi, Telugu, and Tamil films. Her first credited role came as a teenager in Dev Anand's Hum Naujawan (1985), and her first major role was in the Telugu film Coolie No. 1 (1991). In 1994, Tabu received the Filmfare Award for Best Female Debut for the Hindi action drama Vijaypath, which marked her first of many collaborations with co-star Ajay Devgn. The year 1996 was key for Tabu. Her performance as a young woman affected by the Punjab insurgency in Gulzar's Maachis proved to be a breakthrough, winning her the National Film Award for Best Actress. Also that year, Tabu won the Filmfare Award for Best Actress – Telugu for the romance Ninne Pelladata, and featured alongside Govinda in the comedy film Saajan Chale Sasural.

Tabu had a brief role in the war film Border, the highest-grossing Hindi film of 1997, and portrayed a village girl opposite Anil Kapoor in the Priyadarshan-directed drama Virasat. Among her 1999 releases were two of the top-grossing Bollywood films of the yearthe comedy Biwi No.1, and the family drama Hum Saath-Saath Hain. She also starred as the rebellious daughter of a corrupt politician in Gulzar's critically praised drama Hu Tu Tu (1999). The following year, she starred in Kandukondain Kandukondain, a Tamil adaptation of Sense and Sensibility, and played a submissive homemaker in the bilingual drama Astitva. Tabu garnered a second National Film Award for Best Actress for portraying a bar dancer in Madhur Bhandarkar's crime drama Chandni Bar (2001). In 2003, she starred in the Bengali film Abar Aranye, and portrayed a character based on Lady Macbeth, in Maqboolan adaptation of Macbeth from Vishal Bhardwaj. Following a few commercial failures, Tabu played triple roles in M. F. Husain's musical drama Meenaxi: A Tale of Three Cities. Tabu's first international project came with Mira Nair's adaptation of Jhumpa Lahiri's novel The Namesake. In R. Balki's Cheeni Kum (2007), Tabu starred alongside Amitabh Bachchan as a woman romantically involved with a much older man; the role earned her a record fourth Filmfare Critics Award for Best Actress. 

Following a brief role in Ang Lee's adventure film Life of Pi (2012), Tabu starred alongside Salman Khan in Jai Ho, and garnered critical acclaim for playing the Gertrude character in Bhardwaj's Haider. She won the Filmfare Award for Best Supporting Actress for the latter. Tabu's career continued to expand with starring roles opposite Devgn in the thriller Drishyam (2015), the horror comedy Golmaal Again (2017), and the romantic comedy De De Pyaar De (2019). She gained acclaim for playing a murderess in Andhadhun (2018), which ranks as one of the highest-grossing Indian films. In 2020, she featured in the top-grossing Telugu film Ala Vaikunthapurramuloo, winning the Filmfare Award for Best Supporting Actress – Telugu, and starred in the British miniseries A Suitable Boy. Further commercial successes came in 2022 with the sequels Bhool Bhulaiyaa 2 and Drishyam 2.

Films

Television

See also
 List of awards and nominations received by Tabu

Footnotes

References

External links
 
 Tabu on Bollywood Hungama

Tabu
Actress filmographies